The Beit Lid suicide bombing, (also named Beit Lid massacre) was a double suicide attack by the Palestinian Islamic Jihad against Israeli soldiers at the Beit Lid Junction on January 22, 1995. It was the first suicide attack by Palestinian Islamic Jihad.

Background
In 1994, Hani Abed, a Palestinian Islamic Jihad operative, brokered an alliance between Hamas and Palestinian Islamic Jihad. (Hani was later assassinated by Israel). As part of the alliance, Hamas's chief bombmaker, Yahya Ayyash, built the three bombs used by Islamic Jihad for the Beit Lid suicide attack.

The Beit Lid junction is a well-known waypoint towards Netanya. Strategically, it is an important crossroads between Tel Aviv and Haifa located on Highway 4. "On Sunday mornings, Beit Lid was swamped with thousands of young soldiers and aging reservists heading back to military duty from weekend leaves". Ashmoret Prison is located in the southwest corner of the Beit Lid junction. At the time of the bombing, Ahmed Yassin, founder of Hamas, was being held there.

The attack

On 22 January 1995, at approximately 9:30 am, a Palestinian suicide bomber, disguised as an Israeli soldier, approached the bus stop at the Beit Lid junction in central Israel. The bus stop was full of Israeli soldiers who were on their way to their bases after their weekend vacation. The suicide bomber walked into the crowd and detonated the hidden explosives belt he was wearing. About three minutes later a second suicide bomber exploded at the same spot, killing and injuring people wounded in the first explosion, as well as bystanders who had rushed to the scene to assist the victims of the first explosion.

Aftermath
Israeli Prime Minister Yitzhak Rabin toured the bombing site the next day, walking within yards of a kit bag containing a third bomb. Shaaker had left it there for a third suicide bomber, Shahdi Abed al-Rahim, who never made it to the junction. al-Rahim was to have used the bomb to kill Rabin and the Shabak agents accompanying him. The bomb was later recovered, and provided investigators with more evidence implicating Ayyash.

See also
List of massacres in Israel
List of terrorist incidents, 1995

References

Bibliography
 Katz, Samuel. The Hunt for the Engineer. Lyons Press, 2002.

External links

 "Suicide bomb kills 19 at Israel road junction". Boston Herald. January 23, 1995
 "Two-Stage Bombing Kills 19 At Israeli Military Bus Stop". The Washington Post. January 23, 1995
 "Blast kills 19 in Israel".  Sun Journal. January 23, 1995
 "Double Bombing Kills 19 Israelis, Wounds 60". Times Daily. January 23, 1995
 "Interview With a Fanatic". Time. February 6, 1995

Mass murder in 1995
Suicide bombings in 1995
Terrorist incidents in Israel in 1995
January 1995 crimes
January 1995 events in Asia
1995 murders in Israel
Suicide bombing in the Israeli–Palestinian conflict
Massacres in Israel during the Israeli–Palestinian conflict
Massacres in Israel
Islamic terrorism in Israel
Terrorist attacks attributed to Palestinian militant groups
Central District (Israel)